The Professional Bowlers Association (PBA) is the major sanctioning body for the sport of professional ten-pin bowling in the United States. Headquartered in Chicago, Illinois, the PBA membership consists of over 3,000 members worldwide. Members include "pro shop" owners and workers, teaching professionals and bowlers who compete in the various events put on by the Association.

The PBA also oversees competition between professional bowlers via the following tours:
 PBA Tour – An annual calendar of events, currently running from January to December each year.
 PBA Regional Tour – Allows PBA members and qualifying amateurs to compete in weekend events. The Tour consists of seven regions: Central, East, Midwest, Northwest, South, Southwest, and West.
 PBA50/60 Tours – Originally the PBA Senior Tour, it was split in 2013 and now based on age. Set up like the PBA Tour, but allowing PBA members aged 50 years and older, and after the 2013 rebranding, a different tour for members 60 years and older, to compete in their own events. The PBA50/60 Tours also have Regional events. USBC sanctioned events on the PBA50 Tour are still branded as "Senior", and PBA60 Tour events are branded "Super Senior".
 PBA-World Bowling Tour (WBT) – Events outside of North America that award a PBA Tour title if won by a PBA member.
 PBA Women's Regional Tour
 PBA Women's Series (inactive) – Selected PBA Tour events that ran from 2007 to 2010 included a concurrent, separate event for female professionals.
 PBA Jr. – Launched in 2020 as a club for youth bowlers (age 17 and under) to enjoy PBA perks and compete in Regional events with the goal of qualifying for SMART scholarship earnings at the PBA Jr. National Championship.

As of September 2019, the PBA is owned by Bowlero Corporation.

PBA history

20th century
Prior to the PBA's inception, bowling was broadcast on television sporadically beginning in the early 1950s.  NBC began with an early 1950s special telecast entitled Championship Bowling.  Later regular weekly bowling shows, including Jackpot Bowling began airing nationally.

At the same time, there was a desire to start a professional bowling division in the United States; an effort led by Eddie Elias, a sports agent based in Akron, Ohio.  During the 1958 ABC (American Bowling Congress) tournament in Syracuse, New York, sixty men, including Don Carter, Frank Esposito, Buzz Fazio, Matt Lebhar, Carmen Salvino, Billy Welu, Glenn Allison, Steve Nagy, Harry Smith, Ray Bluth, Dick Hoover, Bill Bunetta, Robert "Bobby" Bellew, Vito Quercia, and Junie McMahon, attended a presentation by Elias.  After listening to his proposal, thirty-three of the men donated $50 each, totaling $1,650 to start the organization, which was incorporated in 1958, and headquartered in Akron. The investors then became charter members of the PBA, basically giving them lifetime membership.  Bill Bunetta was slated to be the first commissioner of the PBA by Eddie Elias but Bill was still a very active bowler and turned down the position to continue his bowling and teaching career.

Competition began in 1959 with three tournaments. Italian-born Lou Campi of Dumont, New Jersey won the first event (the Empire State Open), and Dick Weber won the other two (Paramus Eastern Open and the Dayton Open)

The PBA Tour slowly built an audience, expanding to seven tournaments in 1960, then 13 tournaments in 1961, before exploding with 30 tour stops in 1962.  Weber would become the first "face" of the PBA in the early years, as he won 10 of the first 23 events held, including seven in 1961 alone.

While PBA bowlers regularly appeared on Jackpot Bowling, Elias led an effort to give the PBA a permanent home on television. It first did so with the interstitial Make That Spare on ABC Sports, which ran from 1960 to 1964, and then with full games on Professional Bowlers Tour beginning in 1965. Coupled with the continued support of its charter members, as well as sponsorships by the Ford Motor Company, Coca-Cola (which sponsored 11 tournaments in 1963 alone), True Value Hardware and Firestone Tire, the PBA experienced growth in its tournament schedules and prize funds.  Annual incomes for professional bowlers became, at the time, very competitive with other professional sports.  A Sports Illustrated article from 1963 noted that top bowler Harry Smith stood to make as much money in 1963 as Major League Baseball's NL MVP Sandy Koufax and NFL Football MVP Y. A. Tittle combined.

Schedules reached a plateau of 35 tournaments per year in the 1980s. The 1965 Firestone Tournament of Champions was the first to offer $100,000 in prize money (including a then-record $25,000 first prize); the 1982 event featured a $200,000 purse, and the 1987 U.S. Open, sponsored by Seagram distillery, offered a $500,000 prize fund as well as the first $100,000 first-place prize in PBA history.

By the 1980s, True Value pledged $100,000 to any roller of a perfect game on national television (increased to a $200,000 sum during its own True Value Open).  Prior to this, the PBA would award a televised 300 game with $10,000 and, in some seasons, a new Ford or Mercury automobile.  In addition, in the early 1990s the Miller Brewing Company offered $1 million to any bowler who could win all three of its sponsored tournaments in a given season.

As television exposure increased for the PBA, it spun off a PBA Senior Tour in 1981, with Bill Beach winning the first seniors' championship that year. Having been renamed the PBA50 Tour in 2013, the senior bowling tour continues to the present day.

In 1986, a group of professional bowlers who were dissatisfied with PBA management formed the Touring Pro Bowlers (TPB) group. After meeting resistance, the TPB took on the PBA in an antitrust suit. Though settled out of court, the lawsuit did serious financial damage to the PBA.

Elias continued to be involved in the PBA until his death in 1998.

21st century
The PBA was purchased in March 2000 by former Microsoft executives Chris Peters (chairman), Rob Glaser, and Mike Slade, and its corporate headquarters were moved to Seattle, Washington. Together with CEO Steve Miller, a former Nike executive, they are recognized for rescuing the PBA from the brink of extinction. In 2011, Geoff Reiss was appointed as the PBA's CEO and Tom Clark as PBA Commissioner. These two assumed the shared CEO/Commissioner post that was held by Fred Schreyer since he took over for Miller in 2005.

The PBA was featured in the 2006 sports documentary, A League of Ordinary Gentlemen.  The documentary, filmed during the 2002–2003 season, enjoyed a limited release in theaters before being released in a DVD format in March 2006. The PBA was also featured and acknowledged in the 2007 film 7-10 Split.

In 2003, the PWBA (Professional Women's Bowling Association) folded, and the PBA began allowing female members in 2004. Missy Bellinder (Parkin) became the first female PBA member, while Liz Johnson became the first to cash in a PBA Tour event and later (2005) the first to make a PBA Tour telecast. In conjunction with the USBC, the PBA would later inaugurate the PBA Women's Series in 2007.  Following ESPN telecasts of the U.S. Women's Open, it brought back semi-regular women's bowling telecasts for the first time since the demise of the PWBA.  The top two seeds out of a field of sixteen faced each other in one match, aired prior to the men's championship match.  The Women's Series expanded from four events in 2007 to eight events in the 2008–09 and 2009–10 seasons, before being canceled.

In 2009, financial difficulties and the general state of the U.S. economy caused the tour to reduce the number of tour stops and overall events, while also reducing the number of live TV finals broadcasts. The PBA combined its fall schedule of six standard PBA tournaments (plus qualifying for the PBA World Championship) into a single World Series of Bowling event, held that year in Allen Park, Michigan near Detroit.  All fall TV finals except the PBA World Championship were taped and aired at a later date on ESPN, while all but one of the winter tour events continued to hold live TV finals. In 2010, the World Series of Bowling was moved to Las Vegas, Nevada, and consisted of five tournaments with taped TV finals and qualifying for the PBA World Championship.  The overall schedule that season was reduced to just 12 title events, with portions of three winter season events being taped and aired after the fact. Kelly Kulick won the 2010 Tournament of Champions, where she was the first-ever female competitor in the field. This also made her the first woman to win any Professional Bowlers Association Tour event that was also open to men.

For the 2011–12 season, a total of 14 TV broadcasts were taped at the 2011 World Series of Bowling in Las Vegas to be aired on later dates. For the first time, the TV finals for the PBA World Championship did not air live. In fact, ESPN only aired the finals of the PBA's three remaining major tournaments (USBC Masters, U.S. Open and Tournament of Champions) in a live 2012 broadcast.  All other ESPN broadcasts for Winter 2012 were taped events from the World Series, while four additional non-major title tournaments were available live via the PBA's "Xtra Frame" webcast service.

Along with reduced stops, prize funds for some standard tournaments were reduced, starting in 2010, with as little as $15,000 going to the winner.  The 2011 Tournament of Champions, however, did offer a PBA-record $1 million prize fund and an unprecedented $250,000 top prize.

In January 2013, the PBA League, consisting of eight teams of five professional bowlers each, held its first event.

On the eve of the PBA Tour's 60th season (2018), the PBA provided some statistics on the history of the Tour and its bowlers:

 Over 10,000 bowlers have held PBA membership since the organization's founding in 1958.
 As of September 1, 2017, 345 different bowlers have won a PBA Tour title.
 Among the 345 winners, 124 (35.9%) won only one title in their career, while 51 bowlers (15.6%) have earned 10 or more titles.

On September 10, 2019, Bowlero Corporation, the world's largest operator of bowling centers, announced it had purchased the PBA. Bowlero's Chief Customer Officer, Colie Edison, was appointed CEO of the PBA. Bowlero announced that current PBA Commissioner Tom Clark will continue in that role. In January 2022, Colie Edison stepped down as CEO to become Chief Growth Officer for the WNBA.

Beginning with the 2019 PBA Tour season, television coverage moved from ESPN to Fox Sports, with 26 broadcasts being held on Fox Sports 1 and four broadcasts on terrestrial Fox stations.

PBA League

Teams
Dallas Strikers (current player-manager: Norm Duke)

NYC KingPins (current manager: Carolyn Dorin-Ballard)

Chicago Hitmen (formerly Philadelphia Hitmen) (current manager: Jason Couch)

LA X (current manager: Andrew Cain)

Motown Muscle (current manager: Del Ballard Jr.)

Waco Wonder (formerly BROOKLYN STyLES) (current manager: Johnny Petraglia)

Silver Lake Atom Splitters (current manager: Mark Baker)

Portland Lumberjacks (current manager: Tim Mack)

PBR Milwaukee Pounders (added 2020 as Brew City Ballers) (current manager: Marshall Holman)

Las Vegas High Rollers (added 2020) (current manager: Amleto Monacelli)

Championships

By year

By team

Mark Roth League MVP award winners

Hall of Fame
The PBA Hall of Fame was founded in 1975 with eight initial inductees: six for Performance (Ray Bluth, Don Carter, Carmen Salvino, Harry Smith, Dick Weber and Billy Welu) and two for Meritorious Service (Frank Esposito and Chuck Pezzano). Since its inception, it was located at the International Bowling Museum and Hall of Fame in St. Louis, Missouri. It is now part of the new USBC headquarters in Arlington, Texas.

Through 2021, there are 113 PBA Hall of Fame Members in three categories:
 Performance (55)
 Meritorious Service (39)
 Veterans/Senior (19)

Membership in the Hall of Fame was originally determined by annual elections. From 2000 to 2008, those in the Performance category had to have ten PBA titles (or two major championships) on their resume, as well as be retired from the tour for five years.

Another revision took effect in 2008. Bowlers can now qualify for the Hall of Fame based on five PBA titles on their resume, as long as two of those titles were major championships. Other active bowlers can now qualify for the Hall as well if they have 20 years of membership and are elected.

Late in 2008, The PBA announced the launch of a new PBA Seniors Hall of Fame. John Handegard, at the time the all-time leader in PBA Senior titles (14) became the first inductee on January 24, 2009.

References and footnotes

External links

PBA on ESPN

 
Ten-pin bowling
Bowling organizations
Sports in Akron, Ohio
Bowlers Association
Professional sports leagues in the United States